Kahnamu (also Romanized as Kahnamū) is a village in Sahand Rural District, in the Central District of Osku County, East Azerbaijan Province, Iran. At the 2006 census, its population was 2,210, in 644 families.

References 

Populated places in Osku County